雲南 may refer to:

 Yunnan, a province of China
 Yunnan Province, Republic of China
 Unnan, Shimane, Honshu, Japan; a city
 Yunnan Airlines, a former airline that merged into China Eastern Airlines

See also